Natural scale may refer to:

Music
 5-limit diatonic major scale
 Natural minor scale, as opposed to harmonic and melodic
 C major and A minor, the diatonic scale in keys with no sharps or flats
 Harmonic series (music), the series of pitches produced by instruments such as the natural horn and trumpet
 The major scale in Pythagorean tuning, formed from a succession of fifths starting one below the tonic
 On many wind instruments, the scale most easily produced by lifting the fingers one at a time from bottom to top

Other
 Nondimensionalization, the removal of units from a mathematical equation